Anarsia bilbainella is a moth of the family Gelechiidae. It is found in France, Portugal and Spain.

References

Moths described in 1877
bilbainella
Moths of Europe